This is a list of mountains of Switzerland above . This height, in the Alps, approximately corresponds to the level of the climatic snow line. Note that this list includes many secondary summits that are not always considered independent mountains (in the strict sense of the term) but that are mainly of climbing interest. For a list of major summits only, without elevation cut-off, see List of mountains of Switzerland.

This list only includes significant summits with a topographic prominence of at least . There are 437 such summits exceeding 3,000 m in Switzerland. They are found in the cantons of Valais, Bern, Graubünden, Uri, Glarus, Ticino, St. Gallen, Obwalden and Vaud. All mountain heights and prominences on the list are from the largest-scale maps available.

List

See also 
List of buildings and structures in Switzerland above 3000 m

Notes

References